Acast is a Swedish-founded company that provides hosting, monetization and growth support for podcasts, and podcast advertising solutions for brands and media agencies. Launching in 2014, it developed a dynamic insertion technology which can target advertising within podcasts based on location, time, and personal data. The company champions an independent and open ecosystem for podcasting, where podcasts hosted with Acast are available on all podcast listening apps.

Acast hosts over 88,000 podcasts, with over 430 million listens every month. The company operates worldwide with a physical presence in 15 countries, and has its headquarters in Stockholm.

In addition to the founders, Bonnier has also invested in the company. In 2018, additional investors had stepped in with more than $67 million. In 2019, the European Investment Bank invested 25 million euros in Acast, and on June 17, 2021, Acast was listed on the Nasdaq First North Premier Market at a valuation of approximately SEK 7 billion. 

Acast enables digital publishers to insert ads targeting niche audiences. The platform distributes, monetizes and markets podcasts including My Dad Wrote A Porno, The Adam Buxton Podcast and Shagged Married Annoyed, as well as publishers including The Guardian, The Economist, Vice, Vogue and the Financial Times.

History

In 2014, four months after launch, Acast was named Start-up of the Year by IDG magazine, Internetworld, and ‘Most innovative media service’ at mobile industry awards .

In May 2015, Acast closed a $5m Series A funding round, led by Bonnier Growth Media. This was supplemented by an undisclosed follow-on investment from early-stage venture capital firm MOOR, owned by Kaj Hed, majority owner of Rovio Entertainment.

In 2016 Acast launched a paid subscription service called Acast+.

In December 2018 the company raised $35 million from AP1 and Swedbank Robur (sv) funds Ny Teknik and Microcap in Series C funding. This has brought total funding to more than $67 million. In 2019, Acast acquired Pippa, another podcast hosting platform.

Since 2019, Acast has offered a free hosting tier for podcasts. The European Investment Bank invested €25 million in Acast in 2019. 

In early 2021, Acast announced the acquisition of RadioPublic, a Boston-based startup founded by the public radio organization PRX.

In April 2021, rumours about an IPO on Nasdaq Stockholm surfaced. Founders Rosander and Ulvestam sold their last shares earlier in 2021, to fund their new startup . Queerstories joined the Acast Creator Network in May 2021. 

In March 2022, Acast announced that they would be discontinuing their podcast client app. The company cited its decreased importance as a source of user data and their preference for platform-independence in the decision.

In July 2022, Acast signed an agreement to acquire Podchaser, a platform-agnostic podcast database with user reviews, for $27 million by August 2022. 

In August 2022, Acast was ranked #2 in Podtrac's ranking of ad sales networks for podcasts in the US.

In November 2022, Acast entered into a partnership with Amazon. Through the agreement Amazon Music bought all advertising space for thousands of Acast's podcasts, meaning Amazon customers can listen to those shows ad-free, opening up a new revenue channel for the company and broadens the revenue stream for creators.

Notable podcasts hosted by Acast

 Richard Herring's Leicester Square Theatre Podcast
 The Adam Buxton Podcast
 Distraction Pieces Podcast
 Dungeons & Daddies
 The Magnus Archives
 My Dad Wrote a Porno
 The Penguin Podcast
 The Indy Football Podcast
 The Football Ramble
 Shagged Married Annoyed
 The Young Turks
 Aunty Donna Podcast
 WTF with Marc Maron

References

Podcasting companies
Companies based in Stockholm